Zsolt Haraszti (born 4 November 1991) is a Hungarian football player who plays for Paks.

Club statistics

References 
Paksi FC Official Website
HLSZ
MLSZ

1991 births
Footballers from Budapest
Living people
Hungarian footballers
Hungary under-21 international footballers
Association football forwards
Paksi FC players
BFC Siófok players
Fehérvár FC players
Puskás Akadémia FC players
Ferencvárosi TC footballers
MTK Budapest FC players
Nemzeti Bajnokság I players